Governor Seymour may refer to:

Frederick Seymour (1820–1869), Governor of Crown Colony of British Columbia from 1864 to 1866 and Governor of the United Colonies of Vancouver Island and British Columbia from 1866 to 1869
Horatio Seymour (1810–1886), 18th Governor of New York
John Seymour (Maryland governor) (1649–1709), 10th Royal Governor of Maryland from 1704 to 1709
Thomas H. Seymour (1807–1868), 36th Governor of Connecticut